Shreya Ghoshal is an Indian playback singer. Best known as a singer in Hindi, she also sings in other Indian languages including Tamil, Malayalam, Telugu, Kannada, Marathi, Gujarati, Bengali, Assamese, Nepali, Odia, Bhojpuri, Punjabi, Urdu, Tulu etc. and has established herself as a leading playback singer of Indian cinema.

Ghoshal's career began when she won the Sa Re Ga Ma Pa contest as an adult. Her Bollywood playback singing career began with Devdas, for which she received National Film Award for Best Female Playback Singer along with Filmfare Award for Best Female Playback Singer and Filmfare R. D. Burman Award for New Music Talent.

Apart from playback singing, Ghoshal has appeared as a judge on several television reality shows. She performs in musical concerts around the world. She has been honored by the US state of Ohio, where the governor Ted Strickland declared 26 June 2010 as "Shreya Ghoshal Day". In April 2013, she was awarded with the highest honour in London by the selected members of House of Commons of the United Kingdom. In July 2015, John Cranley, the Mayor of the City of Cincinnati also honoured her by proclaiming 24 July 2015 as "Shreya Ghoshal Day of Entertainment and Inspiration" in Cincinnati. She was also featured five times in Forbes list of the top 100 celebrities of India. In 2017, Ghoshal became the first Indian singer to have a wax figure of her in  Madame Tussauds Museum.

Anandalok Puraskar 
The Anandalok Puraskar or Anandalok Awards were presented by the ABP Group for outstanding achievement in Bengali cinema.

Ananda Vikatan Cinema Awards 
Ananda Vikatan Cinema Awards were introduced in 2008 to honour artists in the Tamil film industry annually. It is presented by the Tamil language weekly magazine Ananda Vikatan. Ghoshal has won two awards.

Annual Central European Bollywood Awards 
The Annual Central European Bollywood Awards are fan awards with the voters mostly from Germany, Austria and Switzerland. They are users of the Bollywood Forum belonging to the film website, organizer of the ACEBAs. These awards have been discontinued after 2013. Ghoshal has received four awards from nine nominations.

Asianet Film Awards 
The Asianet Film Awards is an award ceremony for Malayalam films presented annually by Asianet, a Malayalam-language television network from the south-Indian state of Kerala. Ghoshal has received three awards.

Asiavision Movie Awards 
The Asiavision Movie Awards are held annually since 2006 to honour the artists and technicians of South Indian Cinema. Ghoshal has received three awards.

Bengal Film Journalists' Association Awards 
The Bengal Film Journalists' Association Awards (BFJA Awards) are presented by the Bengal Film Journalists' Association, the oldest association of film critics in India, founded in 1937, to acknowledge noteworthy performance in Bengali cinema.

BIG Bangla Movie Awards 
The BIG Bangla Music Awards are presented by the BIG FM Kolkata station bestow excellent achievement in Bengali music. The scope of the event was later extended and it was renamed as BIG Bangla Movie Awards.

BIG Star Entertainment Awards 
The BIG Star Entertainment Awards are presented annually by Reliance Broadcast Network Limited in association with Star India to honour personalities from the field of entertainment across movies, music, television, sports, theater and dance. Ghoshal has received an award from seven nominations.

Bollywood Hungama Surfers Choice Music Awards 
The Bollywood Hungama Surfers Choice Music Awards were presented by Bollywood Hungama to honour the musical work of the artists throughout the Year. The winners have been selected based on the number of votes acquired by each of the contenders. These awards have been discontinued after 2016. Ghoshal has received two awards from four nominations.

Chandanavana Film Critics Academy Awards 
Chandanavana Film Critics Academy is a forum of Kannada cinema journalists, freelancers and critics who nominate movies based on the list provided by the Nominations Committee for the given year. This process has the participation of around 70 journalists from different organisations. The award started in 2020.

Shreya Ghoshal has received two nominations in the category Best Playback Singer (Female) so far.

City Cine Awards 
Shreya Ghoshal has won two awards from many nominations.

Edison Awards Tamil 
The Edison Awards (Tamil) is an annual awards ceremony since 2009 for people in the Tamil film industry. Shreya Ghoshal has won three awards for Best Female Playback Singer from many nominations.

Filmfare Awards 
The Filmfare Awards are one of the oldest and most prestigious Hindi film awards. They are presented annually by The Times Group for excellence of cinematic achievements. Ghoshal received six awards from twenty six nominations. Besides this, she also received Filmfare RD Burman Award for New Music Talent in 2003 for her outstanding performance in Devdas.

Filmfare Award for Best Female Playback Singer

Filmfare RD Burman Award for New Music Talent

Filmfare Awards Bangla 
The Filmfare Awards East is the Bengali segment of the annual Filmfare Awards, presented by The Times Group to honour both artistic and technical excellence of professionals in the East Indian (Bengali) film industry. Ghoshal received nine nominations in the category of Best Female Playback Singer.

Filmfare Awards Marathi 
The Filmfare Awards Marathi is the Marathi segment of the annual Filmfare Awards, presented by The Times Group to honour both artistic and technical excellence of professionals in the Marathi cinema. Ghoshal has received three nominations.

Filmfare Awards South 
The Filmfare Awards South is the South Indian segment of the annual Filmfare Awards, presented by The Times Group to honour both artistic and technical excellence of professionals in the South Indian film industry. Ghoshal is the most awarded and also the most nominated singer by Filmfare South, receiving ten awards from forty-five nominations.

Kannada 
Ghoshal has received two Kannada Best Playback Singer awards from sixteen nominations.

Malayalam 
Ghoshal has received four Malayalam Best Playback Singer awards from thirteen nominations.

Tamil 
Ghoshal has received two Tamil Best Playback Singer awards from seven nominations.

Telugu 
Ghoshal has received two Telugu Best Playback Singer awards from nine nominations.

FOI Online Awards 
FOI Online Awards is an annual online poll, researched, organised and voted by a team of film enthusiasts, honouring the artists for their artworks. The poll is held yearly in the month of January–February to judge the best of the Hindi film industry for their masterpieces in the previous year. The jury follows research and successive rounds of voting to elect nominations and winners.
The 1st FOI Online Awards were announced on 14 February 2016 to judge the best of Hindi cinema in 2015.

Best Female Playback Singer 

Ghoshal has won two awards from nine nominations.

Best Original Song 
(For the category Best Original Song, Composer(s), Lyricist(s) and Singer(s) of the song are credited)

Shreya received one award from four nominations.

Films And Frames Digital Awards
{| class="wikitable plainrowheaders" width="100%" textcolor:#000;"
! scope="col" width=5%|Year
! scope="col" width=26%|Category
! scope="col" width=26%|Song
! scope="col" width=26%|Film
! scope="col" width=15%|Result
! scope="col" width=2%|Ref.
|-
!rowspan="3"|2020
| Helo Viewer's  Choice – Best Playback (Female)
|rowspan="3"|"Tomake"
| rowspan="3"|Parineeta
|rowspan="3"
|
|-
|Helo Viewer's Choice - Best Song
|
|-
| Jury Awards – Best Playback
|
|-
!scope|2021
|Best Female Playback (Viewer's Choice)
|"Preme Tame (Title Song)"
|Prem Tame
|
|
|-
|}

 Grammy Awards 

 Gaana User's Choice Icons 
Gaana User's Choice Icons was started by Gaana in 2014. The winners are recognized on the basis of public voting on social networking platforms. The 2nd installment of the awards were held in 2018 (end of 2017), after a gap of three Years.

 Hindi 

 Tamil 

 Global Indian Music Academy Awards 
The Global Indian Music Academy Awards are presented annually by Global Indian Music Academy to honour and recognise Indian music artists. Ghoshal received three awards in different categories.

 Guild Awards 
The Apsara Film & Television Producers Guild Awards are presented by the Apsara Producers Guild to honour and recognise the professional excellence of their peers. Ghoshal has received four awards from sixteen nominations. She holds the record of maximum awards and nominations in the Best Female Playback Singer category.

 Indian Telly Awards 
The Indian Telly Awards is an annual award presented by indiantelevision.com group for excellence both on-screen and behind-the-scenes of television in India. Ghoshal has received two awards from seven nominations.

Indian Television Academy Awards
Shreya Ghoshal has won two Indian Television Academy Awards.

 International Indian Film Academy Awards 
The International Indian Film Academy Awards are presented annually by the International Indian Film Academy to honour excellence of cinematic achievements in the Hindi language film industry. Ghoshal has received eight awards from twenty three nominations. She holds the record of maximum awards and nominations in the Best Female Playback category.

 IIFA Utsavam 
The IIFA Utsavam, started in 2016, is the South Indian segment of the annual International Indian Film Academy Awards, to honour both artistic and technical excellence of professionals in the South Indian music industry.

 Kannada 
Ghoshal has received one award from two nominations.

 Malayalam 
Ghoshal has received one awards from two nominations.

 Telugu 
Ghoshal has received three nominations.

Indian Independent Music Awards

Ishq Music Awards

Just For Women Movie Awards
Shreya Ghoshal has received two nominations for "Best Female Playback Singer"

 Kerala State Film Awards 
The Kerala State Film Award are the film awards for a motion picture made in Kerala. The awards have been bestowed by Kerala State Chalachitra Academy since 1998 on behalf of the Department of Cultural Affairs, Government of Kerala, India. Ghoshal has received four awards.

 Koimoi Bollywood Audience Poll 
In 2012, Koimoi.com Editor Komal Nahta picks the best of Bollywood of 2011. From 2013 onwards, an online poll is conducted for the audience to vote. Shreya Ghoshal has been 9 times as the winner for Best Female Playback Singer from twelve nominations.

 MaTa Sanman 
The MaTa Sanman or MaTa Awards are presented by the Maharashtra Times to felicitate significant contribution of individuals to Marathi cinema. Shreya Ghoshal has won two awards.

 Mirchi Music Awards 
The Mirchi Music Awards are presented annually by Radio Mirchi to honour both artistic and technical excellence of professionals in the Hindi language film music industry of India. Shreya Ghoshal has received 17 awards from 71 nominations in different categories.

Female Vocalist Of The Year

For the category Female Vocalist Of The Year, Shreya Ghoshal has won six awards from twenty one nominations. In addition, she won Female Vocalist of the Decade in 2021 from three nominations

Overall Table

 Mirchi Music Awards Bangla 
The Mirchi Music Awards Bangla is the Bengali segment of the annual Mirchi Music Awards, presented by Radio Mirchi to honour both artistic and technical excellence of professionals in the Bengali language film music industry of India. Ghoshal has received seven awards from nineteen nominations.

 Mirchi Music Awards Marathi 
The Mirchi Music Awards Marathi is the Marathi segment of the annual Mirchi Music Awards, started in 2014, presented by Radio Mirchi to honour both artistic and technical excellence of professionals in the Marathi music industry. Ghoshal has received four awards from seventeen nominations.

 Mirchi Music Awards Punjabi 
The Mirchi Music Awards Punjabi is the Punjabi segment of the annual Mirchi Music Awards, started in 2014, presented by Radio Mirchi to honour both artistic and technical excellence of professionals in the Punjabi music industry. Ghoshal has received a nomination.

 Mirchi Music Awards South 
The Mirchi Music Awards South is the South Indian segment of the annual Mirchi Music Awards, started in 2010 by Radio Mirchi to honour both artistic and technical excellence of professionals in the South Indian music industry. Ghoshal has received seven awards from thirty-one nominations in several categories.

 Kannada 
Ghoshal has received three awards from fourteen nominations.

 Malayalam 
Ghoshal has received two awards from ten nominations.

 Tamil 
Ghoshal has received an award from four nominations.

 Telugu 
Ghoshal has received multiple awards multiple nominations.

Maharashtracha Favourite Kon

Majja Digital Awards (Films)

 National Film Awards 
The National Film Awards is the most prestigious film award ceremony in India. Established in 1954, it is administered by the International Film Festival of India and the Indian government's Directorate of Film Festivals. The awards are presented by the President of India. Due to their national scale, they are considered to be the equivalent of the American Academy Awards. Shreya Ghoshal has received four awards for
Best Female Playback Singer. 

Norway Tamil Film Festival Awards
Shreya Ghoshal has bagged one award for Best Female Playback Singer. Nomination is not announced.

 RMIM Puraskaar 
The RMIM Puraskaar borrows its name from the news group rec.music.Indian.misc, the oldest community of Hindi Film Music lovers on the net. These awards voice the opinion of HFM listeners scattered all over the Internet including on forums, groups, blogs, and social networks. Shreya Ghoshal has won 21 awards from 46 nominations in different categories till date.

 Screen Awards 
The Screen Awards honour excellence of cinematic achievements in the Hindi film industry. Ghoshal has won seven awards from twenty nominations. She holds the record of maximum awards in Best Female Playback category.

 South Indian International Movie Awards 
The South Indian International Movie Awards, also known as the SIIMA Awards, started in 2012, rewards the artistic and technical achievements of the South Indian film industry. Ghoshal received an award from twenty seven nominations.

 Kannada 
Ghoshal has received 6 nominations.

 Malayalam 
Ghoshal has received 5 nominations.

 Telugu 
Ghoshal has received an SIIMA Award for Best Female Playback Singer (Telugu) from 10 nominations.

 Tamil 
Ghoshal has received 6 nominations.

 SSE Live Awards 
The SSE Live Awards were started by SSE plc in 2015 to honour the best act/concert of the Year at each of their arenas viz SSE Hydro Glasgow, SSE Arena Belfast and SSE Arena Wembley. The winners are decided by the online public voting on SSE Rewards.

 Tamil Nadu State Film Awards 
The Tamil Nadu State Film Awards are the most prestigious film awards given for Tamil films in India. They are given annually to honour the best talents and provide encouragement and incentive to the South Indian film industry by the Government of Tamil Nadu. Ghoshal has received two awards.

 Times of India Film Awards 
The Times of India Film Awards are presented by The Times of India to honour both artistic and technical excellence of professionals in the Hindi language film industry of India. The award was first held in 2013, then in 2016. Ghoshal has received an award from four nominations.

 Vanitha Film Awards 
The Vanitha Film Awards are presented annually by Vanitha, an Indian magazine from the Malayala Manorama'' group in the south Indian state of Kerala. The awards ceremony has been instituted to honour both artistic and technical excellence in the Malayalam language film industry. Held and broadcast annually since 1998. Shreya Ghoshal won five awards in two-different categories.

Vijay Awards
The Vijay Awards are presented by the Tamil television channel STAR Vijay to honour excellence in Tamil cinema. It has been given annually since 2007. The awards are decided by a jury, consisting of noted film-makers, critics and technicians. Shreya Ghoshal has won one award for Best Female Playback Singer.

West Bengal Film Journalists' Association Awards 
The West Bengal Film Journalists' Association Awards (WBFJA Awards) are presented by the West Bengal Film Journalists' Association for the Bengali Film Industry. Shreya has won two awards from five nominations.

Zee Cine Awards 
The Zee Cine Awards are presented by Zee Network for the Hindi film industry. The awards were inaugurated in 1998 and include categories decided by public votes and an industry jury. The awards were not presented in 2009, 2010 and 2015. Ghoshal has received eight awards from twenty one nominations. She holds the record of maximum awards in Best Female Playback category.

Zee Cine Awards Tamil

Zee Chitra Gaurav Puraskar 
The Zee Chitra Gaurav Puraskar initiated by Zee Marathi are presented annually to reward excellence in Marathi cinema. Ghoshal has received three awards from six nominations.

Other Awards

Other Honorary Awards

See also 
 List of songs recorded by Shreya Ghoshal
 Filmography of Shreya Ghoshal

References

External links 
 Shreya Ghoshal Official Website

Shreya Ghoshal
Lists of awards received by Indian musician